The New Swiss Family Robinson is a 1998 American adventure film directed by Stewart Raffill. The film is based on the 1812 novel The Swiss Family Robinson by Johann David Wyss, and stars Jane Seymour, David Carradine, James Keach, John Mallory Asher, Blake Bashoff, and Jamie Renée Smith.

Plot

When Jack Robinson (James Keach) gets a new job in Australia, he decides to take his wife Anna (Jane Seymour), sons Shane (John Mallory Asher) and Todd (Blake Bashoff) and daughter Elisabeth 'Lizzy' (Jamie Renée Smith) by sailing a yacht from Hong Kong to Sydney. Elisabeth begins keeping an online journal of their trip. Jack's employer Sheldon Blake (David Carradine) gives him a gun for protection before the trip. The first part of the journey goes smoothly and the family is enchanted by the beauty of the sea (except for Anna who is violently ill).

However, one night they find themselves followed by a strange ship. It turns out that Sheldon is the leader of a band of modern day pirates who are using Jack and his family to smuggle a cache of money and jewels. They order the Robinsons to turn over the yacht and leave in the lifeboat. A fierce gun battle ensues and the family manages to escape. However a storm causes them to run into a reef and they find themselves shipwrecked and marooned on a deserted island

Salvaging parts of the boat, the Robinsons learn survival skills and build a shelter. Shane also discovers Francoise (Yumi Iwama), a French-speaking Asian girl who is also living on the island. She captures him and the two soon fall in love. Francoise is an airplane crash survivor who has been living on the island since her airplane crashed and lives a semi-feral life with two orangutans. Upon the Robinsons being formally introduced to Francoise, she later teams up with the family where Anna gives her a shower and some new clothes. Francoise has a maturing effect on Shane who wishes to marry her. The family even adopts an orangutan to whom they give first aid. The pirates return in one final showdown. Using their newly learned skills, the Robinsons are able to outwit them and escape back to civilization.

Cast
 Jane Seymour as Anna Robinson
 David Carradine as Sheldon Blake 
 James Keach as Jack Robinson
 John Mallory Asher as Shane Robinson
 Blake Bashoff as Todd Robinson
 Jamie Renée Smith as Elizabeth Robinson
 Simone Griffeth as Cynthia
 Yumi Iwama as Francoise
 Billy Bates as Halo Pirate
 Rick Kahana as Ninja Pirate
 Joe Isaac as Drunken Pirate
 John Harnagel as Bartender Pirate
 Jaime Irizarry as Nettle Spray Pirate
 John Edmondson as Wheelhouse Pirate
 Diane Kirman as Girlfriend Pirate

References

External links
 

1999 films
1990s action adventure films
1999 television films
American action adventure films
American television films
Films about families
Films directed by Stewart Raffill
Films scored by John Scott (composer)
Films based on The Swiss Family Robinson
Films set on islands
Jungle adventure films
Pirate films
Disney television films
1990s American films